The Khachik Formation is a geologic formation in Armenia, Azerbaijan and Iran. It preserves fossils dating back to the Capitanian to Wuchiapingian stages of the Permian period.

See also 
 List of fossiliferous stratigraphic units in Armenia
 List of fossiliferous stratigraphic units in Azerbaijan

References 

Geologic formations of Armenia
Geologic formations of Azerbaijan
Geologic formations of Iran
Permian System of Asia
Permian Armenia
Permian Azerbaijan
Permian Iran
Capitanian
Wuchiapingian